Wangyuan Road is a station on Line 5 of the Shanghai Metro. Located at Wangyuan Road and Hangnan Highway in the city's Fengxian District, the station is located on the main branch of Line 5 and opened as part of the southern extension of Line 5 on 30 December 2018. It is an underground station.

References 

Railway stations in Shanghai
Shanghai Metro stations in Fengxian District
Railway stations in China opened in 2018
Line 5, Shanghai Metro